Jabir Husain (born 5 June 1945), is an Indian politician and the former Member of the Parliament representing Bihar in the Rajya Sabha. He is affiliated with the Rashtriya Janata Dal. He currently resides in his private residence in Patna.

Background 
Jabir Husain was born on 5 June 1945 in Nonhi Village, Rajgir in a well-to-do Shia Muslim family. He started his professional journey as a professor in English language and literature in RD&DJ College Munger, a constituent college of Bhagalpur University. In 1974 on call of Jayprakash Narayan, he got deeply involved and actively participated in Total Revolution. As a result he was persecuted and suspended from University service. He was also an English teacher.

Political career 
In 1977 on Janta Party ticket, Prof Husain fought the Bihar Legislative Assembly election from Munger constituency. He won the election by 41441 votes, the highest margin in the state. This stellar result earned him a cabinet berth in the Karpoori Thakur ministry. He was appointed as Health Minister.

From October, 1990 to March, 1995 Prof Husain served as Chairman of the Bihar State Minority Commission.

Bihar Vidhan Parishad 
In June 1994 the Governor of Bihar nominated Prof Husain to Bihar Legislative Council . A year later in April 1995, he was appointed as Acting Chairman of the Council. And finally on 26 July 1996 he was elected uncontested the Chairman of Bihar Legislative Council. After competing his term he was reappointed and elected unopposed as Chairman again on 7 May 2000.

Rajya Sabha 
Prof. Jabir Husain was elected to the Rajya Sabha on 29 March 2006 and subsequently, he relinquished the post of Chairman, Bihar Vidhan Parishad on 15 April 2006. He completed his 6 year term on 2 April 2012.

Literary works 
Prof. Husain has authored more than two dozen books in Hindi, Urdu and English. He is also credited for editing over 50 rare Urdu-Persian manuscripts.

Honours 
Sahitya Akademi Puraskar  for "Ret par Khema" in Urdu language category in 2005.

Vishwa Hindi Samman at the 9th Vishwa Hindi Conference in Johannesburg in 2012.

References

External links
 Profile on Rajya Sabha website

1945 births
Living people
Indian Muslims
Rashtriya Janata Dal politicians
Rajya Sabha members from Bihar
Recipients of the Sahitya Akademi Award in Urdu
People from Nalanda district
Members of the Bihar Legislative Council
Chairs of the Bihar Legislative Council
Janata Party politicians
Janata Dal politicians
Academic staff of Tilka Manjhi Bhagalpur University